Calvin is an unincorporated community in Huntingdon County, Pennsylvania, United States. Calvin has a post office, with ZIP code 16622.

References

Unincorporated communities in Huntingdon County, Pennsylvania
Unincorporated communities in Pennsylvania